John Vaughan, 3rd Earl of Carbery KB, FRS (baptised 8 July 1639 – 12 January 1713), styled Lord Vaughan from 1643 to 1686, was a Welsh nobleman and colonial administrator who served as the governor of Jamaica between 1675 and 1678.

Life
He was the second son of Richard Vaughan, 2nd Earl of Carbery, and his second wife Frances (c.1621 – 9 October 1650), daughter of Sir John Altham of Oxhey, Watford, Hertfordshire. He inherited his title and the Carmarthenshire estate (Golden Grove) in 1686 on the death of his father. His elder brother Francis had already died.

He was invested as a Knight, Order of the Bath (KB) in April 1661. He was Member of Parliament (MP) for Carmarthen between 1661 and 1679 and again for Carmarthenshire between 1679 and 1689. He served as the governor of Jamaica from 1674 to 1678. His deputy was the celebrated privateer and fellow Welshman Sir Henry Morgan. During his tenure as governor, he unsuccessfully tried to defeat the Jamaican Maroons, who were led at the time by Juan de Serras.

He had a reputation for debauchery; Samuel Pepys described him as "the lewdest fellow of the age". Edward Hyde, 1st Earl of Clarendon, whose impeachment Vaughan strongly supported, called him a man who was "as ugly in face as in fame". As governor of Jamaica, he became notorious for corruption, and was even accused of selling his servants into slavery.

He was President of the Royal Society between 1686 and 1689, having been elected a Fellow in 1685. He was Colonel of the Regiment of Foot from 1673 to 1674 and Lord of the Admiralty from 1689 to 1690.

On his death his titles became extinct. His estates passed to a cousin, another John Vaughan (1693–1765), who rebuilt the Golden Grove mansion.

Family

Vaughan married twice, first to Mary Brown, daughter of George Brown of Green Castle; they had no children. He remarried on 10 October 1682 to Anne Savile, daughter of George Savile, 1st Marquess of Halifax and his first wife, Lady Dorothy Spencer. They had two children;
 George Vaughan (b. 6 October 1683, bur. 7 May 1685) died aged 2.
Anne Vaughan (d. 20 September 1751) who in 1713 married Charles Paulet, 3rd Duke of Bolton

See also
 List of presidents of the Royal Society

References
 
 
 
 thepeerage.com

Notes

External links
 

1639 births
1713 deaths
Earls in the Peerage of Ireland
Lords of the Admiralty
Vaughan, John Vaughan, Lord
Governors of Jamaica
Fellows of the Royal Society
Presidents of the Royal Society
English MPs 1661–1679
17th-century Jamaican people